Hassan Abu Basha (2 December 1922 – 18 September 2005) was a major general and one of the former ministers of interior of Egypt who was in office for two years from January 1982 to July 1984.

Early life and education
Basha was born in Cairo on 2 December 1922. He graduated from the police academy in 1945.

Career
Basha was a leading figure during the Nasser era. He was a member of the Arab Socialist Union from 1962 and became part of its secret unit, the Socialist Vanguard (Arabic: al-Tanzim al-Tali‘i), which was also called the Vanguard Organization, in 1963 when the unit was established. He served as deputy interior minister when Nabawi Ismail was in office under President Anwar Sadat. As assistant minister, he organized operations against fundamentalists and arrested them at the end of the 1970s. He also led such operations following the assassination of Anwar Sadat in October 1981.

Basha was appointed interior minister in January 1982 by President Hosni Mobarak, replacing Nabawi Ismail in the post. Basha preferred dialogue instead of coercion to deal with social and political problems. His attitude towards the Islamists, including the Muslim Brotherhood, had positive consequences. Basha's term lasted until July 1984 when he was replaced by Ahmed Rushdi as interior minister. Basha's removal was unexpected, since he was considered to be one of the significant figures in the regime of Mobarak. Basha was appointed minister of local government in July 1984 and was in office until 1986.

Assassination attempt
On 5 May 1987, Basha survived an assassination attempt perpetrated by the Islamist militants, including Ayman Zawahiri's brother Hussein Zawahiri. The attack was organized near Basha's home in Cairo, and unknown gunmen seriously injured Basha. Basha underwent surgery following the attack.

The terrorist group Survivors of Hell claimed the responsibility of the attack. Some members of the group were arrested in August 1987.  The group also attempted to kill former interior minister Nabawi Ismail and an Egyptian journalist after the attack.

Upon this event, Egypt broke all diplomatic ties with Iran, claiming that the group which perpetrated the attack was financially supported by Iran. Hussein Zawahiri was convicted for his alleged role in the assassination attempt. Yasser Borhamy was also detained for a month due to his alleged connection with the assassination attempt against Basha.

Books
Basha published his memoirs in a book entitled Mudhukrat Hasan Abu Basha (Arabic: Memoirs of Hasan Abu Basha) in 1990.

Personal life and death
Basha was married and had three children, a son and two daughters. He died at the age of 82 in Cairo on 18 September 2005.

Awards
Basha was the recipient of the Republic second class medal in 1973 and the second class merit medal in 1979.

References

External links

 

20th-century Egyptian politicians
1922 births
2005 deaths
Egyptian generals
Interior Ministers of Egypt
Politicians from Cairo
Survivors of terrorist attacks
Arab Socialist Union (Egypt) politicians